It's Arbor Day, Charlie Brown is the 15th prime-time animated television special based on Charles M. Schulz's comic strip Peanuts. The subject of the special is Arbor Day, a secular holiday devoted to planting trees. It's Arbor Day, Charlie Brown premiered on the CBS network on March 16, 1976, which is near the dates in which most U.S. states observe Arbor Day. This is the first special to feature the character Rerun van Pelt (younger brother to Linus and Lucy), who had debuted in the Peanuts comic strip in March 1973.

The musical score features the final compositions and recorded performances of Vince Guaraldi, a jazz pianist whose many contributions to Peanuts include the theme "Linus and Lucy". Guaraldi died on February 6, 1976—less than two months before the special's premiere.

It's Arbor Day, Charlie Brown was distributed as a bonus feature on Paramount Home Video's 2003 DVD-Video release of It's the Easter Beagle, Charlie Brown (1974). A remastered version was published on DVD by Warner Home Video in 2008, and in the DVD box set Peanuts 1970's Collection, Vol. 2 in 2010.

Plot
Linus repairs his Mother's bike with Charlie Brown watching. Linus' Mother leaves with Rerun on the back seat. Rerun goes through all the places they are set to visit, including the Arbor Day meeting. After Sally Brown is humiliated in class for misunderstanding the purpose of Arbor Day (she defines it as "the day when all the ships come sailing into the arbor"), she is told that she has to write a full report on Arbor Day, and Linus goes with her to the library to help her with the report. Linus leaves the library after Sally's repeated attempts to make him fall in love with her. The scene cuts to Charlie Brown and Peppermint Patty talking under a tree. Patty asks Charlie Brown to explain love to her, before she cuts him out several times. She switches the topic to baseball, going over the time her team plays his team, confident that she will win over him every time. Sally, Linus, Lucy, Snoopy and Woodstock decides to plant a lush garden—in Charlie Brown's baseball field, despite Linus' protests. Lucy then calls in the whole team to help with the planting. Charlie Brown is unaware on what is actually going on, and stays at home to work on his team's strategy. The gang informs Charlie Brown that they will name the field Charlie Brown Field, to his happiness. He is shocked to find what has happened to the field when they show him. Charlie Brown tries to make the best of the situation by placing baseball gloves and caps on the trees to make them look like scarecrows. The trees catch so many fly outs, Peppermint Patty's team is unable to score, giving Charlie Brown's team the advantage. Schroeder tells Lucy that he will kiss her if she hits a home run. To Schroeder's surprise and Charlie Brown's delight, Lucy hits the home run and scores the first run of the game. Moments later, Charlie Brown's joy turns to anguish as the game is rained out in a huge storm ruining the chance of his team winning their first game. At school the next day, Sally gives a successful report on the true meaning of Arbor Day. Meanwhile, Peppermint Patty speaks kindly to a discouraged Charlie Brown, she compliments the garden in Charlie Brown Field and wishes him "Happy Arbor Day", cheering him up.

Cast

(Marcie, Franklin, Violet, and Patty appear in the film, but have no lines.)

Credits
 Written and Created by: Charles M. Schulz
 A Lee Mendelson-Bill Melendez Production
 Directed by: Phil Roman
 Produced by: Bill Melendez
 Executive Producer: Lee Mendelson
 Music Composed and Performed by: Vince Guaraldi
 Designed by: Tom Yakutis, Ellie Bogardus, Evert Brown, Bernard Gruver, Ed Levitt, Frank Smith
 Animation by: Sam Jaimes, Don Lusk, Bill Littlejohn, Bob Matz, Bob Carlson, Hank Smith, Bob Bachman, Rudy Zamora, Warren Batchelder
 Assisted by: Al Pabian, Larry Leichliter, Patricia Joy, Jeff Hall, Joe Roman
 Animation Directors By: Beverly Robbins, Eleanor Warren, Manon Washburn, Joice Lee Marshall, Carla Washburn
 Ink and Paint Supervision: Joanne Lansing
 Checking: Eve Fletcher, Peggy Drumm, Carole Barnes
 Ink and Paint: Chandra Poweris, Pat Covello, Pat Capozzi, Sheri Barstad, Roubina Sarkissian, Cheri Lucas, Valerie Pabian, Charlotte Richardson
 Editing: Robert T. Gillis, Chuck McCann, Roger Donley
 Production Manager: Carole Barnes
 Recording: Coast Recorders · Radio Recorders
 Dubbing: Producers' Sound Service · Don Minkler
 Camera: Dickson/Vasu
 Production Assistant: Sandy Claxton
 In cooperation with United Feature Syndicate, Inc. and Charles M. Schulz Creative Associates
 THE END 
"It's Arbor Day, Charlie Brown" 
© 1976 United Feature Syndicate, Inc.

Production
Like the other Peanuts specials of the era, It's Arbor Day, Charlie Brown was directed by Phil Roman, and produced by Bill Melendez.

The special recycles animated sequences from Snoopy, Come Home (1972), There's No Time for Love, Charlie Brown (1973), A Charlie Brown Thanksgiving (1973), and You're a Good Sport, Charlie Brown (1975).

This special is the only time Charlie Brown would be voiced by Dylan Beach (in his only acting role) as well as Lucy Van Pelt being voiced by Sarah Beach (both children of late actor Scott Beach). It is unknown why Duncan Watson and Melanie Kohn were replaced, as they would return for Race for Your Life, Charlie Brown (1977).

The Earth Day theme was revisited in It's the Small Things, Charlie Brown (2022).

Music score
It's Arbor Day, Charlie Brown was the last Peanuts special to feature original music composed by Vince Guaraldi (except where noted), who was best known for the Peanuts' signature tune, "Linus and Lucy." 47-year-old Guaraldi died suddenly several hours after completing the soundtrack for this special. With the untimely death of Guaraldi, later Peanuts animated specials lack the same jazzy musical score as previous entries. As such, It's Arbor Day, Charlie Brown is seen by some fans as the swan song of the "golden era" of Peanuts animation. In addition, it was the first Peanuts special since Charlie Brown's All Stars! (1966) that was not conducted and arranged by John Scott Trotter, who had died on October 29, 1975.

Guaraldi recorded most of the music score in January 1976 at Wally Heider Studios, working as a trio with bassist Seward McCain and drummer Jim Zimmerman. Several cues contained elements of previously used songs "Baseball Theme," "Rain, Rain Go Away" and "Joe Cool". The special's main theme — a gentle waltz that incorporates elements of "Christmas Time Is Here" — is heard repeatedly throughout, going by several different titles as they pertain to a specific scene.

All music cues were composed by Guaraldi and performed by the Vince Guaraldi Trio.

"Rerun's Lament" (version 1, variation of "Christmas Time Is Here")
"Eighty-Nine Bottles of Beer" (vocal: Vinnie Dow) (Traditional)
"Rerun's Lament" (version 2, variation of "Christmas Time Is Here")
"Ships Sail into Arbor"
"Laughter in the Library" (variation of "Christmas Time Is Here")
"Flatten Platten" (variation of "Baseball Theme")
"Young Man's Fancy" (variation of "Christmas Time Is Here")
"Jay Sterling Morton Jazz" (variation of "Christmas Time Is Here")
"We're the Visiting Team" (variation of "Christmas Time Is Here")
"Seeds for Thought" (variation of "Joe Cool")
"Don't Forget the Shovel" (variation of "Christmas Time Is Here")
"Sprinkle Your Bird" (variation of "Christmas Time Is Here")
"Flatten Platten" (version 2, variation of "Baseball Theme")
"Snoopy at Bat"
"Lucy's Home Run"
"Take Me Out to the Ball Game" (vocal: Vinnie Dow) (Jack Norworth, Albert Von Tilzer)
"Lucy's Home Run"
"Rain, Gentle Rain" (variation of "Rain, Rain, Go Away")
"Laughter in the Library" (variation of "Christmas Time Is Here")
"Happy Arbor Day, Charlie Brown" (variation of "Christmas Time Is Here")
"Lucy's Home Run" (reprise, end credits)

No official soundtrack for It's Arbor Day, Charlie Brown was commercially released. However, New Age pianist George Winston covered "Young Man's Fancy" and the opening portion of "Sprinkle Your Bird" (retitled "Seeds for Thought") on his Guaraldi tribute albums, Linus and Lucy: The Music of Vince Guaraldi (1996) and Love Will Come: The Music of Vince Guaraldi, Volume 2 (2010), respectively.

References

External links

1970s animated television specials
CBS television specials
Peanuts television specials
Television shows directed by Phil Roman
1970s American television specials
1976 television specials
1976 in American television
Baseball animation
American baseball films
Holiday fiction